Francisco Valada (15 May 1941 – 23 December 2021) was a Portuguese cyclist. He competed in the individual road race and team time trial events at the 1960 Summer Olympics.

Valada died on 23 December 2021, at the age of 80.

References

External links
 

1941 births
2021 deaths
People from Cartaxo
Portuguese male cyclists
Olympic cyclists of Portugal
Cyclists at the 1960 Summer Olympics
S.L. Benfica (cycling)
Volta a Portugal winners
Sportspeople from Santarém District